Humba is a genus of beetles belonging to the family Chrysomelidae.

Species
 Humba balyi (Jacoby 1893)
 Humba cyanicollis (Hope 1831)
 Humba flava (Linnaeus 1758)
 Humba gracilis (Schulthess 1894)
 Humba hyalodes Johnston, H. B., 1956
 Humba miniatipennis Johnston, H. B., 1956

References
 Biolib
 Global Names

Chrysomelinae
Chrysomelidae genera